The A339 is a  A road in England. It is the main road between Newbury in Berkshire and Alton in Hampshire. It also forms the eastern and northern parts of the Basingstoke Ring Road. Its most northern end eventually merges into the A34 north of Newbury just before meeting the M4 at J13 (Chieveley services). The section between the A34 and Newbury town centre was previously part of the A34.

Points of interest

Roads in England
Transport in Hampshire
Transport in Berkshire